Lofa-5 is an electoral district for the elections to the House of Representatives of Liberia. The constituency covers Salayea District and Zorzor District (except Konia and Barziwen).

Elected representatives

References

Electoral districts in Liberia